Autographa macrogamma is a moth of the family Noctuidae. It is found from Fennoscandia, to the northern parts of European Russia, Siberia and Mongolia.

The wingspan is 36–42 mm. Adults are on wing from the end of June to beginning of August.

The larvae feed on Trollius europaeus and Sorbus aucuparia.

External links
Fauna Europaea
Lepidoptera of Norway

Plusiini
Moths of Europe
Moths of Asia
Moths described in 1842